Pragasam is a surname. Notable people with this surname include:

 Arul Pragasam (1948–2019), Tamil activist
 Darren Rahul Pragasam (born 1999), Malaysian squash player